The Upper Manair Dam is a dam on the Manair River, at Narmal Village, Gambhiraopet mandal, Rajanna Sircilla district, Telangana by Nizam.

Situated at narmala village, rajanna sircilla district. Foundation stone laid in 1943 by Nizam of Hyderabad state. Back water present mainly in LACHAPET, srigadha village SRIGADHA and KOLLAMADDI villages. Across the back water at srigadha bridge is constructed in the year 2018 and opened by minister Sri Kalvakuntla taraka ramarao

See also

 Sriram Sagar Project
 Lower Manair Dam
 Mid Manair Dam
 Sripada Yellampalli project
 Nizam Sagar
 Kaddam Project
 Pranahita Chevella
 Alisagar lift irrigation scheme
 Sri Komaram Bheem Project
 Icchampally Project

References

Dams on the Godavari River
Dams in Telangana
Godavari basin
Dams completed in 1950
Irrigation in Telangana
20th-century architecture in India